Olive Branch is an unincorporated community located outside the  town of Marshville, North Carolina, United States which is located in Union County. Olive Branch is a rural area where the major industry is farming. There are no neighborhoods located in Olive Branch. Houses are typically at least one-half mile apart. There is one gas station, which also services cars and changes oil. The store was locally owned until 2006, when it was bought out by a chain of stores. There are approximately four or five churches in the community, of mostly Baptist denomination.

References

Unincorporated communities in Union County, North Carolina
Unincorporated communities in North Carolina